GlobeNet is a wholesale telecom operator that connects the Americas with various services (Network, IP, Data Center and Security), supported by its  subsea cable system and IT infrastructure.

The subsea cable system has landing points in:

 Tuckerton, New Jersey, USA
 Boca Raton, Florida, USA
 St David's, Bermuda
 Maiquetia, Venezuela
 Fortaleza, Brazil
 Praia Grande, Brazil
 Rio de Janeiro, Brazil
 Barranquilla, Colombia
 Las Toninas, Argentina

Over the last year, the company has set up a data center in Barranquilla (Colombia), a major interconnection point (IX) in Fortaleza (Brazil) and a new subsea cable to Argentina, called Malbec.

Ownership
GlobeNet is a private company, part of BTG Pactual's Infrastructure Fund II. BTG Pactual is one of the most important investment banks in Latin America.

Sources

External links
Company's website.
BTG Pactual website.
GlobeNet submarine cable map. Telegeography.
GlobeNet's Malbec cable extension to Argentina. Telegeography.
GlobeNet named Frost and Sullivan 2018 Company of the Year.
GlobeNet wins ‘Connectivity Provider of the Year Award’ at Datacloud Awards 2018.
GlobeNet wins at Capacity Media's Global Carriers Awards 2018.
GlobeNet wins big at Global Carrier Community Awards 2018.

Submarine communications cables in the North Atlantic Ocean
Submarine communications cables in the Caribbean Sea
Submarine communications cables in the South Atlantic Ocean